Robert Gage may refer to:

Bobby Gage (1927–2005), American football player
Robert Gage (equestrian), (1952–2019), American equestrian show jumping rider and coach
Robert Gage (MP) (c. 1519–1587), MP for Lewes
Robert Gage (ornithologist) (1813–1891), Irish ornithologist and owner of Rathlin Island
Robert Merrell Gage (1892–1981), American sculptor